Gun laws in Georgia may refer to:
 Gun laws in Georgia (U.S. state); or
 Gun laws in Georgia (country).

See also 
 Georgia (disambiguation)